In child psychology, Papert's principle is often used to explain the results of  Jean Piaget's experiments.  It is named for Seymour Papert and states that:

See also
Association
Attention
Dissociation 
Child development
Developmental psychology 
Language development
Mental development 
Thought

References

External links

Developmental psychology